The Shuili or Shueili River is a river in Nantou County, Taiwan.

Geology
It flows through Nantou County for 19 km and is the tributary for Zhuoshui River.

Power generation
The river passes through the Minghu Dam and Mingtan Dam in Shuili Township to generate electricity during off peak period with a capacity of 1,008 MW and 1,602 MW respectively.

See also
Sun Moon Lake
Mingtan Dam
Minghu Dam
List of rivers in Taiwan

References

Landforms of Nantou County
Rivers of Taiwan